A terminal emulator, or terminal application, is a computer program that emulates a video terminal within some other display architecture. Though typically synonymous with a shell or text terminal, the term terminal covers all remote terminals, including graphical interfaces. A terminal emulator inside a graphical user interface is often called a terminal window.

A terminal window allows the user access to a text terminal and all its applications such as command-line interfaces (CLI) and text user interface (TUI) applications. These may be running either on the same machine or on a different one via telnet, ssh, dial-up, or over a direct serial connection. On Unix-like operating systems, it is common to have one or more terminal windows connected to the local machine.

Terminals usually support a set of escape sequences for controlling color, cursor position, etc. Examples include the family of terminal control sequence standards known as ECMA-48, ANSI X3.64 or ISO/IEC 6429.

History

Computer terminals

Emulators

Local echo

Terminal emulators may implement a local echo function, which may erroneously be named "half-duplex", or still slightly incorrectly "echoplex" (which is formally an error detection mechanism rather than an input display option).

Line-at-a-time mode/Local editing

Terminal emulators may implement local editing, also known as "line-at-a-time mode". This is also mistakenly referred to as "half-duplex". In this mode, the terminal emulator only sends complete lines of input to the host system. The user enters and edits a line, but it is held locally within the terminal emulator as it is being edited. It is not transmitted until the user signals its completion, usually with the  key on the keyboard or a "send" button of some sort in the user interface. At that point, the entire line is transmitted. Line-at-a-time mode implies local echo, since otherwise the user will not be able to see the line as it is being edited and constructed. However, line-at-a-time mode is independent of echo mode and does not require local echo. When entering a password, for example, line-at-a-time entry with local editing is possible, but local echo is turned off (otherwise the password would be displayed).

The complexities of line-at-a-time mode are exemplified by the line-at-a-time mode option in the telnet protocol. To implement it correctly, the Network Virtual Terminal implementation provided by the terminal emulator program must be capable of recognizing and properly dealing with "interrupt" and "abort" events that arrive in the middle of locally editing a line.

Synchronous terminals

In asynchronous terminals data can flow in any direction at any time. In synchronous terminals a protocol controls who may send data when. IBM 3270-based terminals used with IBM mainframe computers are an example of synchronous terminals. They operate in an essentially "screen-at-a-time" mode (also known as block mode). Users can make numerous changes to a page, before submitting the updated screen to the remote machine as a single action.

Terminal emulators that simulate the 3270 protocol are available for most operating systems, for use both by those administering systems such as the z9, as well as those using the corresponding applications such as CICS.

Other examples of synchronous terminals include the IBM 5250, ICL 7561, Honeywell Bull VIP7800 and Hewlett-Packard 700/92.

Virtual consoles

Virtual consoles, also called virtual terminals, are emulated text terminals, using the keyboard and monitor of a personal computer or workstation. The word "text" is key since virtual consoles are not GUI terminals and they do not run inside a graphical interface. Virtual consoles are found on most Unix-like systems. They are primarily used to access and interact with servers, without using a graphical desktop environment.

Examples of terminals emulated
Many terminal emulators have been developed for terminals such as VT52, VT100, VT220, VT320, IBM 3270/8/9/E, IBM 5250, IBM 3179G, Data General D211, Hewlett Packard HP700/92, Sperry/Unisys 2000-series UTS60, Burroughs/Unisys A-series T27/TD830/ET1100, ADDS ViewPoint, Sun console, QNX, AT386, SCO-ANSI, SNI 97801, Televideo, and Wyse 50/60. Additionally, programs have been developed to emulate other terminal emulators such as xterm and assorted console terminals (e.g., for Linux). Finally, some emulators simply refer to a standard, such as ANSI. Such programs are available on many platforms ranging from DOS and Unix to Windows and macOS to embedded operating systems found in cellphones and industrial hardware.

Implementation details

Unix-like systems 
In the past, Unix and Unix-like systems used serial port devices such as RS-232 ports, and provided   device files for them.

With terminal emulators those device files are emulated by using a pair of pseudoterminal devices. This pair is used to emulate a physical port/connection to the host computing endpoint - computer's hardware provided by operating system APIs, some other software like rlogin, telnet or SSH or else.

There are also special virtual console files like /dev/console. In text mode, writing to the file displays text on the virtual console and reading from the file returns text the user writes to the virtual console.  As with other text terminals, there are also special escape sequences, control characters and functions that a program can use, most easily via a library such as ncurses. For more complex operations, the programs can use console and terminal special ioctl system calls. One can compare devices using the patterns vcs ("virtual console screen") and vcsa ("virtual console screen with attributes") such as /dev/vcs1 and /dev/vcsa1.

Some terminal emulators also include escape sequences for configuring the behavior of the terminal to facilitate good interoperation between the terminal and programs running inside of it, for example to configure paste bracketing.

The virtual consoles can be configured in the file /etc/inittab read by init -- typically it starts the text mode login process getty for several virtual consoles. X Window System can be configured in /etc/inittab or by an X display manager. A number of Linux distributions use systemd instead of init, which also allows virtual console configuration.

CLI tools 
Typical Linux system programs used to access the virtual consoles include:

  to switch the current virtual console
  to run a program on a new virtual console
  to close a currently unused virtual console

System loading 
The program startx starts the X Window System on a new virtual console. There are also other graphical programs that can start from the console (e.g. LinuxTV and MPlayer etc.)

See also
 Binary Synchronous Communications
 List of terminal emulators
 Online service provider
 Serial interface
 Terminal multiplexer

Notes

References

External links

 
 Terminal Window Definition by The Linux Information Project (LINFO)

User interfaces
Technical communication tools
 
Bulletin board systems